Mike Grady  may refer to:

Mike Grady (actor) (born 1946), British character actor
Mike Grady (baseball) (1869–1943), American baseball catcher